"Meet the Flintstones", also worded as "(Meet) The Flintstones", is the theme song of the 1960s animated television series The Flintstones. Composed in 1961 by Hoyt Curtin, Joseph Barbera and William Hanna, it is one of the most popular and best known of all theme songs, with its catchy lyrics "Flintstones, meet the Flintstones, they're the modern Stone Age family".

Background
The opening and closing credits theme during the first two seasons was called "Rise and Shine", a lively instrumental underscore accompanying Fred on his drive home from work. The tune resembled "The Bugs Bunny Overture (This Is It!)", the theme song of The Bugs Bunny Show, also airing on ABC at the time, which may have been why it was changed in the third season.

Before being adopted as the TV theme, "Meet the Flintstones" was released on the Golden Records 78 rpm children's record release Songs of the Flintstones (Golden R680, 1961), as the A-side to a version of "Rise and Shine" with lyrics. It includes verses related to Barney and Betty Rubble and to Dino that are not heard in the later TV version. The melody of "Meet the Flintstones" can also be heard as incidental music in some episodes of the first two seasons.

Starting in Season 3, Episode 3 ("Barney the Invisible"), "Meet the Flintstones" became the opening and closing credits theme. This version was recorded by a 22-piece big band conducted by Curtin and performed by the Randy Van Horne Singers. The melody is believed to have been inspired from part of the B section of the second movement of Beethoven's Piano Sonata No. 17 (The "Tempest"). The "Meet the Flintstones" opening was later added to the first two seasons for syndication, with "Rise and Shine" restored when the series was rereleased to syndication and, later, home video in the 1990s. The musical underscores were also credited to Curtin for the show's first five seasons; Ted Nichols took over in 1965 for the final season. During the show's final season, "Open Up Your Heart (And Let the Sunshine In)", performed by Pebbles and Bamm-Bamm in a clip from that season's first episode, was used as alternate close music.

Popularity
In 2010, a PRS for Music survey of 2,000 adults in the UK found that the "Meet the Flintstones" theme tune was the most recognised children's TV theme, ahead of those for Top Cat and Postman Pat.

Jazz standard
Recorded in E-flat major, "Meet the Flintstones" has become a jazz standard; it conforms to the structure known as rhythm changes, a well-known kind of jazz composition. It is often played to amuse audiences as part of a medley, in what is known as "jazz humor". The International Association of Jazz Record Collectors calls it "campy" and "cheek by jowl". Often performed at an exhilarating pace, it is technically challenging for some. The song has been recorded by Barry Harris Live at Maybeck Recital Hall, Volume Twelve in the middle of a jazz medley with "It Never Entered My Mind" and "I Love Lucy". In 2015, The Brian Setzer Orchestra recorded a version with Christmas-themed lyrics, "Yabba-Dabba-Yuletide", on its Christmas album Rockin’ Rudolph.

The song was featured in the sitcom Full House and its successor Fuller House.

The BC-52's cover

The song was covered by American new wave band the B-52's as "the B.C. 52's", a fictional band from the film The Flintstones, with an additional verse added. The song was released as a single from the movie's soundtrack, peaking at number 33 on the US Billboard Hot 100. It was the band's joint highest entry on the Billboard Hot Dance Club Play chart at number three, tying with "Summer of Love" from 1986. The song was also the band's second-highest-charting single in the U.K. (the highest being "Love Shack" at number two), also peaking at number three. Its accompanying music video received heavy rotation on MTV Europe and was A-listed on Germany's VIVA in August 1994.

Critical reception
Larry Flick wrote in Billboard, "That's actually enduring kitsch rock act the B-52's having a field day with the theme from the classic animated series. Lifted and revamped from the soundtrack to the upcoming movie, the track pushes an insistent tribal beat, topped with snatches of cartoon music and vocal loops. Props to remixer Junior Vasquez for a valiant effort. He handles the task of turning a novelty tune into hip jam with agility. Still, the whole thing is so weird that punters may stand and listen before they begin to twirl." Dave Sholin from the Gavin Report concluded, "Only someone who's been hiding in a cave or living under bedrock for the past year wouldn't know about this cartoon come-to-life. Who better than this fun-loving trio to put a '90s spin on this well-known theme." Pan-European magazine Music & Media commented, "Yabba Dabba Doo! Temporarily renamed BC-52's, Fred Schneider and Kate Pierson make a credible Fred and Wilma on this 'remake of the cartoon's classic theme song." Alan Jones of Music Week wrote, "The Flintstones movie spins off its first single, a quirky remake of the familiar theme tune by the barely incognito B52's. Great fun, in both its succinct pop edit and a stomping house remix."

Track listings
 7-inch single
 (Meet) The Flintstones (original LP version) (Fred's edit) – 2:24
 (Meet) The Flintstones (Barney's edit) – 2:28

 12-inch maxi
 (Meet) The Flintstones (Space Cowboy mix 1) – 6:55
 (Meet) The Flintstones (Space Cowboy mix 2) – 6:55
 (Meet) The Flintstones (instrumental) – 6:55

Charts

Weekly charts

Year-end charts

Certifications

Release history

Jacob Collier and other covers
On May 1, 2016, Jacob Collier released a multitrack vocal jazz version of the song as the second single from his debut album In My Room. He won the Grammy Award for Best Arrangement, Instrumental and Vocals for the cover at the 59th Annual Grammy Awards.
The song is also a running gag on the musical parody YouTube channel SiIvaGunner, where it is frequently incorporated into bait-and-switch videos claiming to be "high quality rips" of video game music produced by the group.

References

External links
 "(Meet) The Flintstones" Arrangement for jazz guitar

The Flintstones
1960 songs
1960s jazz standards
1994 singles
American jazz songs
Animated series theme songs
Children's television theme songs
Comedy television theme songs
The B-52's songs
Jazz compositions in E-flat major
MCA Records singles
Songs about fictional characters
Songs about families